Reshef Tenne (1944) is an Israeli scientist.

Biography
Born in Kibbutz Usha, Tenne received his BSc in Chemistry and Physics from Hebrew University in Jerusalem in 1969, where he also received his MSc (1971) and PhD (1976).

Academic and scientific career
He then spent three years at the Battelle Institute in Geneva, Switzerland, before joining the Weizmann Institute on 1979. He was promoted to full professor in 1995.

Tenne is the Drake Family Professor and Head of the Department of Materials and Interfaces at the Weizmann Institute of Science, and Director of the Helen and Martin Kimmel Center for Nanoscale Sciences, director of the G.Schmidt Minerva Center for Supramolecular Architectures and holds the Drake Family Chair in Nanotechnology. Tenne recently joined the Advisory Board of the newly launched Veruscript Functional Nanomaterials.

In 1992, following the discovery of carbon nanotubes, he predicted that nanoparticles of inorganic compounds with layered structures, such as MoS2, would not be stable against folding and would also form non-carbon nanotubes and fullerene-like structures.

Awards and recognition
In 2005, Tenne received the Materials Research Society (MRS) Medal for his work on inorganic fullerenes.
In 2020, awarded the EMET Prize

References

External links
Reshef Tenne home page at the Weizmann Institute of Science.

1944 births
Living people
Israeli scientists
Israeli chemists
Israeli nanotechnologists
Academic staff of Weizmann Institute of Science